Albert Moeschinger (10 January 1897 – 25 September 1985) was a Swiss composer.

Life 
Born in Basel, Moeschinger, son of a merchant, completed his musical studies in Bern, Leipzig (composition with Paul Graener, piano with Robert Teichmüller) and Munich (composition with Walter Courvoisier). After several seasons as an ensemble pianist in café houses, Moeschinger settled in Bern, where he taught privately as a piano and theory teacher, and from 1937 also at the University of the Arts Bern, and resumed his compositional activities.

In 1943, health problems led him to settle in the Valais mountain village of Saas Fee. From this time on, he devoted himself exclusively to composition. Reading Thomas Mann's musical novel Dr. Faustus and the subsequent correspondence with the writer in 1948 encouraged him to integrate the twelve-tone technique into his work. After 1956, Moeschinger lived mainly in Ascona. He spent the rest of his life in Thun, where he died on 25 September 1985 at the age of 88.

Moeschinger's oeuvre, which includes all genres except opera, comprises over 400 titles. His estate is housed in the Basel University Library.

Traces of Moeschinger's church music can be found in the hymnal of the Protestant Reformed Churches of Switzerland:  215 Herr wir warten arm und hungrig (same melody also 318, 553 and 717) and 256 Es ist ein Wort ergangen.

Compositions 
 Vocal work:
 Der Herbst des Einsamen (ein Gedenkmal for Georg Trakl) für Frauenchor a cappella
 Miracles de l'enfance for mezzo-soprano and small orchestra
 Dialogue for tenor, baritone and orchesta
 Le Chansonnier pour Mariette for voice and piano
 Pieces for piano:
 9 kleine Klavierstücke
 D'un cahier valaisan
 3 Toccatas
 Chamber music:
 Klaviertrio
 Quintett über Schweizerische Volkslieder for flute, oboe, clarinet, horn and bassoon
 Quatuor anthérin for saxophone quartet
 Consort for strings
Introduzione e scherzo for 2 violins and viola (1933)
Portrait of Emmy, Trio for 2 violins and viola (1967)
 Concertante pieces:
 5 Klavierkonzerte
 Violinkonzert
 Trompetenkonzert
 Concert pour une ballerine, saxophone et orchestre
 Orchestral work:
 5 symphonies
 Extra muros for woodwinds and brass, harp, piano, celesta, vibraphone and percussion
 Fantasia 1944, for string orchestra
 Erratique for large orchestra
 On ne traverse pas la nuit for large orchestra

Further reading 
 Christoph Ballmer: Moeschinger, Albert. In Historical Dictionary of Switzerland.
 
 Hans Oesch: Albert Moeschinger. Biogramm, in KDG – Komponisten der Gegenwart, im Munzinger-Archiv (Artikelanfang frei abrufbar)
 Helene Ringgenberg: Albert Moeschinger: Biographie. Müller & Schade, Bern 2008, .

References

External links 
 

20th-century classical composers
1897 births
1985 deaths
Musicians from Basel-Stadt
20th-century Swiss composers